Elmwood is a provincial electoral division in the Canadian province of Manitoba.

1914-1920
The original Elmwood riding existed from 1914 to 1920, in what was then a suburban community in the north of Winnipeg. Its provincial Members of the Legislative Assembly (MLAs) were:

1958-present
The modern Elmwood riding was created by redistribution in 1957, and has formally existed since the provincial election of 1958. It is located in the northeastern section of the amalgamated City of Winnipeg; the Red River forms its western and part of its southern boundary. The Elmwood riding existing from 1958 to 1969 was confined to the actual Elmwood area of the city of Winnipeg. In the redistribution of 1969 part of East Kildonan was added. Since 1981 the Elmwood riding has moved further north into East Kildonan taking in much of the old Kildonan riding (existing between 1958 and 1981) while the eastern part of the Elmwood area has been removed and added to the Concordia riding created in 1981.

Elmwood is mostly working-class and industrial. According to the 1999 Canadian census, manufacturing accounted for 18% of all industry in the riding.  Thirty-one per cent of the riding's residents are listed as low-income.  The average family income in Elmwood was $41,842, and the unemployment rate was 9.40%.

The riding has a significant immigrant population, including 9% of German background and 8% of Ukrainian background.  18% of the riding's residents over age 65.

The New Democratic Party of Manitoba (and its predecessor, the Manitoba Co-operative Commonwealth Federation) have won Elmwood in every provincial election since the riding's creation.  It was one of just four Winnipeg seats retained by the NDP in the disastrous 1988 general election.

List of provincial representatives

Election results

1914 general election

1915 general election

1958 general election

1959 general election

1962 general election

1966 general election

1969 general election

1973 general election

1977 general election

1981 general election

1986 general election

1988 general election

1990 general election

1995 general election

1999 general election

2003 general election

2007 general election

2009 by-election

2011 general election

2016 general election

2019 general election

Previous boundaries

References

Manitoba provincial electoral districts
Politics of Winnipeg